Daniel Samper Pizano (born 8 June 1945) is a Colombian lawyer, journalist, and prolific writer.

Career
Samper attended the Gimnasio Moderno, where he began writing in the student newspaper El Aguilucho. At the age of 19 he worked for the Colombian newspaper El Tiempo as a reporter. After graduating from high school, Samper studied law in the Pontifical Xavierian University and later attended graduate school for journalism at the University of Kansas, United States. He was also awarded the Nieman Fellowship by Harvard University. Since then he has been an editor, columnist and author of some 38 books, TV and movie screenwriter and winner of numerous recognitions and awards in Colombia and abroad; Among these, the Maria Moors Cabot prize awarded by Columbia University, the  "Rey de España" prize and has won the Colombian "Simón Bolívar Prize for Journalism" three times.
His writings are notable for his wide-ranging and soft sense of humor, combined with a degree of social criticism. He writes a column for El Tiempo, entitled "Cambalache" (colloquialism meaning "Exchange") and the magazine Carrusel with a humor section called "Postre de notas", as well as various articles for Colombian magazines such as El Malpensante, Revista Semana and Gatopardo. In Colombia, Samper is also considered the father of Colombian investigative journalism for his work as a reporter with the El Tiempo newspaper.

Since 1986 Samper has resided in Madrid; he was an editor of the Spanish magazine Cambio 16. He is also a member of the Academia Colombiana de la Lengua. As a TV screenwriter, he wrote scripts for the Colombian TV series Dejémonos de vainas during the 1980s and 1990s.

Personal life
Daniel was born in Bogotá on 8 June 1945 to Andrés Samper Gnecco and Helena Pizano Pardo, the eldest of five children, his other siblings were, Ernesto, José Gabriel, Juan Francisco, and María Fernanda. He married Cecilia Ospina Cuéllar, with whom he had three children, Juanita, María Angélica, and Daniel. He later divorced and married Pilar Tafur in 1974.

Selected works

External links
 Daniel Samper's column in El Tiempo: "Cambalache"
 Daniel Samper's history of column writings at Revista Carrusel "Postre de Notas"
 Página de la revista Carrusel donde se puede leer la columna semanal de humor del Daniel Samper

1945 births
Living people
People from Bogotá
Daniel
Colombian male writers
Colombian journalists
Male journalists
Maria Moors Cabot Prize winners
University of Kansas alumni
Nieman Fellows
Pontifical Xavierian University alumni